Government Press Office (abbreviated: GPO; , Lishkat Ha-Itonut Ha-Memshaltit; abbreviated: לע"ם, La'am) is responsible – on behalf of the Prime Minister's Office – for coordination between the Government of Israel and the community of journalists and media personnel working in the country. The GPO serves as the central address for foreign press contact with the government and the Israel Defense Forces.
The director of the GPO, since August 2012, is Nitzan Chen.

The establishment of the GPO 
Prior to the foundation of the State of Israel, the Jewish Agency leadership understood the need to explain the Zionist idea to the public opinion around the world.v
In 1924 Gershon Agronsky was appointed to serve as the head of public relations in the Political Division of the Jewish Agency. This agency was named the Press Office. Along with the World Zionist Organization administrationand the Jewish National Fund, it published – in Hebrew, English, German, French and Spanish – a weekly bulletin entitled "Information from Israel".
In 1934 the news division of the Jewish Agency was established with Joseph Gravitzky as its head.  Later, the news division had separated from the Jewish Agency and became independent under the direction of Yeshayahu Klinov. The news division and the press office were both managed by Moshe Sharett. 
The news division supplied news items to newspapers in Israel in addition to supplying information from the Jewish world to Jewish newspapers around the world.
In 1951 Moshe Pearlman was appointed to be the first director of the Israel Government Press Office.
Other agencies involved in Israeli public diplomacy field were Keren Hayesod, The Jewish National Fund and the United Jewish Appeal.

The activity of the GPO 
The GPO works to facilitate media coverage of key elements in Israel, state visits and the visits of other foreign VIPs. The GPO issues press cards for permanently stationed and visiting journalists, as well as a range of cards for other media personnel (broadcast technicians, documentary film producers, media assistants, etc.). 
The GPO offers media representatives a sophisticated briefing room, television studio and professional support materials. In addition, the GPO is responsible for opening communication centers for important events such as papal and US presidential visits.
The GPO is equipped to operate in Hebrew, Arabic, English and Russian. A separate department takes care of the economic press. The GPO forwards a daily summary of articles about Israel in the English overseas press to various Government offices The GPO is responsible for translating and distributing press releases from the Prime Minister's Office, the President's Office and other government agencies. One of its main public diplomacy activities is initiating foreign press tours around the country.  In addition, the GPO initiates communication workshops – lessons in appearance in front of an audience, appearance in front of the camera etc. – for various VIPs. 
The GPO Photography Department is responsible for photographing the president and prime minister at official events and press conferences in Israel and abroad. The Photography Department operates the National Photo Collection, which includes tens of thousands of photographs from before the establishment of the state up to the present. By virtue of a Government decision, the National Photo Collection was opened in 2011 for free use by the public.
In 2013 a new media department was established. This department is responsible for the GPO website and social media platforms. The GPO provides video streaming services for on-line press conferences and is currently working on a more advanced website as well as on a smartphone application.
The GPO established the Government Spokespersons Forum, which formulated a code of ethics for government spokespersons. In addition, a Foreign Media Correspondents Forum was established.

Goals of the GPO 
 Strengthening the deep bond between the foreign press and the Government of Israel.
 Expanding the photographed documentation service of government symbols.
 Providing accessibility for its activities

Press cards 
The GPO is responsible for issuing press credentials in Israel.  The press card is designed to assist those involved in media work in the country. The GPO press card is issued to Israeli and foreign press according to defined criteria and allows access to government events that are open only to media personnel. Every request is submitted for a security review. 
In 2012 the GPO began issuing press cards for bloggers. A press card is not a condition for media work; applying for one is not a requirement.

Former GPO directors 
Moshe Pearlman
David Landor (1976–1954)
Dr. Miron Medzini (1977–1976)
Zeev Hefetz (1983–1977)
Mordechai Dolinsky (1986–1983)
Israel Peleg (1988–1986)
Yoram Ettinger- Eitan (1990–1988)
Dr. Josef Olmert (1993–1990)
Uri Dromi (1996–1993)
Moshe Fogel (2000–1996)
Daniel Seaman (2010–2000)
Oren Helman (2010-2011)

References

External links
 

National Photo Collection, Government Press Office, Photography Dept

Government of Israel